Edmonton-Avonmore was a provincial electoral district in Alberta, Canada, mandated to return a single member to the Legislative Assembly of Alberta using the first-past-the-post method of voting from 1971 to 1997.

History
The Edmonton-Avonmore electoral district was created in the 1970 boundary redistribution from portions of Strathcona South.

The Edmonton-Avonmore electoral district was abolished in the 1996 boundary redistribution and was combined with a small portion of Edmonton-Gold Bar to form Edmonton-Mill Creek.

Members of the Legislative Assembly (MLAs)

Election results

1971 general election

1975 general election

1979 general election

1982 general election

1986 general election

1989 general election

1993 general election

See also
List of Alberta provincial electoral districts
Avonmore, Edmonton, a neighbourhood in south east Edmonton

References

Further reading

External links
Elections Alberta
The Legislative Assembly of Alberta

Former provincial electoral districts of Alberta
Politics of Edmonton